William Ede may refer to:

 William Moore Ede, priest
William Ede (MP) for New Shoreham (UK Parliament constituency)

See also
William Eddy (disambiguation)